Twenty eight-spotted potato ladybird is a common name for several beetles and may refer to:

Henosepilachna vigintioctomaculata
Henosepilachna vigintioctopunctata

Coccinellidae